Lau Kong is a Hong Kong actor who worked on the network TVB.

Biography
Little is known of Lau's private life, but he has been acting since 1976, when he first joined the now defunct network Commercial Television, he later joined RTV (now ATV, Lau would be an actor there from 1979-1982. From 1982 onwards, Lau has been serving as veteran actor there, portraying various types of roles, (mostly as a patriarch, and many TVB actors and actresses have been his "son" or "daughter“, and there are very few actors in TVB that have never worked with him.

Filmography

Films
Last Hurrah for Chivalry (1979)
Demi-Gods and Semi-Devils (1982)
Queen of Kowloon (2000)
Beast Stalker (2008)
The Stool Pigeon (2010)

Commercial Television

Rediffusion

TVB

References

External links

Hong Kong male television actors
Living people
TVB actors
1946 births
20th-century Hong Kong male actors
21st-century Hong Kong male actors
Hong Kong male film actors